Patrick Neighly is a former journalist currently working in the Hollywood visual effects industry. He is better known in some quarters for writing several comic books and graphic novels, including the prescient Subatomic, which predicted both domestic spying by the NSA and an Edward Snowden-esque response to it in the aftermath of 9/11. His comic book work has been published in the US and France.

Bibliography 
 Subatomic (with Jorge Heufemann, Mad Yak Press, 2004 )
 Anarchy for the Masses (with Kereth Cowe-Spigai, Disinformation, 2004 )
 First Lady (with Stephen R. Buell, Mad Yak Press, 2005)
 Texarkana (with Donny Hadiwidjaja, Mad Yak Press, 2005 )
 The Supernaturalists (with Jorge Heufeman, Mad Yak Press, 2005 )
 Black-Eyed Susan issues 1-3 (with Donny Hadiwidjaja, Mad Yak Press, 2007 )

External links 
 Disinformation

American male journalists
American filmmakers
Living people
Year of birth missing (living people)